The men's 100m butterfly S11 event at the 2008 Summer Paralympics took place at the Beijing National Aquatics Center on 9 September. There were two heats; the swimmers with the eight fastest times advanced to the final. The final produced a dead-heat for third place and two bronze medals were awarded.

Results

Heats
Competed from 09:40.

Heat 1

Heat 2

Final
Competed at 17:44.

Q = qualified for final. WR = World Record. DQ = Disqualified.

References
 
 

Swimming at the 2008 Summer Paralympics